My Life Is Yours (Italian: La mia vita è tua) is a 1954 Italian melodrama film directed by Giuseppe Masini and starring Armando Francioli and Patricia Roc.

Cast
 Armando Francioli as Marco Ridolfi  
 Patricia Roc as Laura  
 Alba Arnova as Silvia  
 Lucien Gallas as Don Antonio  
 Achille Togliani 
 Mino Doro as Il medico  
 Roberto Bruni 
 Giulio Calì 
 Gemma Bolognesi 
 Nietta Zocchi 
 Renato Chiantoni 
 Fedele Gentile 
 Maria Grazia Monaci 
 Cesare Sindaci 
 Franco Franchi 
 Sandro Pistolini

References

Bibliography
 Hodgson, Michael. Patricia Roc. 2013.

External links

1954 films
1950s Italian-language films
1954 drama films
Italian drama films
Italian black-and-white films
Melodrama films
1950s Italian films